Monsters is a Japanese television drama series, broadcast on TBS, starring Katori Shingo and Tomohisa Yamashita. The series aired in Autumn 2012.

Cast
 Katori Shingo as Heihachi Hiratsuka
 Yamashita Tomohisa as Kosuke Saionji
 Emi Takano as Kanako Yanagihara
 Tomoya Warabino as Kanji Takakura
 Daisuke Kikuta as Hayato Kudo
 Tatsuya Hino as Junichi Fujisaki
 Tomoya Shiroishi as Shuji Hara
 Yasukage Hinaka as Koji Kitagawa
 Makoto Ohtake as Wataru Kenmochi
 Kenichi Endō as Hajime Kaneda

Episodes

References

External links
 

2012 Japanese television series debuts
2012 Japanese television series endings
Japanese drama television series
Nichiyō Gekijō